A Penny for Your Thoughts may refer to:

"A Penny for Your Thoughts" (The Twilight Zone), an episode of The Twilight Zone
"Penny for Your Thoughts", a 1975 song by Peter Frampton from the album Frampton
"A Penny for Your Thoughts", a 1982 song by Tavares